Jean Waline (18 August 1933 – 23 June 2022) was a French academic and politician.

Biography
Jean was the son of jurist and academic , who served on the Constitutional Council. He earned an agrégation in law and became a law professor at Robert Schuman University.

In 2002, Waline was the subject of Mélanges offerts à Jean Waline, published by Dalloz as part of the "Précis Dalloz" on administrative law. He was a member of the scientific council of the Fondation Louise Weiss. He was also president of the International Institute of Human Rights from 2005 to 2011.

A member of the Rally for the Republic, Waline was described as "a formidable swordsman in search of [...] broad popular recognition" as a politician. He was at the forefront of the fight for the LGV Est high-speed rail line while serving as Vice-President of the General Council of Bas-Rhin with an appeal to the Prime Minister and a petition. Having entered politics in 1977, he experienced a surprise defeat against socialist Olivier Blitz in the 2008 French cantonal elections.

Jean Waline died in Strasbourg on 23 June 2022 at the age of 88.

Awards
Commander of the Ordre national du Mérite (2007)
Commander of the Legion of Honour (2012)

Publications

Books
Précis de droit administratif
Les Établissements de santé privés à but non lucratif
Gouverner, administrer, juger - Liber amicorum
Notes d'arrêts de Marcel Waline

Articles
"Le Médiateur est admirablement placé pour détecter les failles de notre système législatif et réglementaire"
"Le rôle du juge administratif dans la détermination de l'utilité publique justifiant l'expropriation"
"Les révisions de la Constitution de 1958"
"À propos de la loi Constitutionnelle du 28 mars 2003"
"Le rejet par la France de la Constitution européenne"

References

1933 births
2022 deaths
Departmental councillors (France)
Rally for the Republic politicians
Academic staff of the University of Strasbourg
People from Thionville
Commandeurs of the Légion d'honneur
Commanders of the Ordre national du Mérite